Reeman is a surname. Notable people with the surname include:

Douglas Reeman (1924–2017), British author who used the pseudonym Alexander Kent
Jops Reeman (1886–1959), Dutch soccer player
Mohammed Reeman (born 1996), Saudi Arabian soccer player

See also
Freeman (surname)
Reema